Oikos is a village in the Nicosia District of Cyprus.

References

External links

Communities in Nicosia District